Mark Jeffrey Rosker is a physicist at the Defense Advanced Research Projects Agency (DARPA) in Arlington, Virginia. He was named a Fellow of the Institute of Electrical and Electronics Engineers (IEEE) in 2012 for his work on microwave and millimeter-wave phased arrays, gallium nitride semiconductors, and terahertz electronics.

References 

Fellow Members of the IEEE
Living people
21st-century American engineers
Semiconductor physicists
Year of birth missing (living people)
American electrical engineers